Celius Hudson Dougherty (May 27, 1902 – December 22, 1986) was an American pianist and composer of art songs and other music.

Biography
Celius Hudson Dougherty was born to William Francis Dougherty and Louise Martha Dougherty in Glenwood, Minnesota. Celius was interested in music and poetry from childhood.  He claimed that he wrote his first song when he was seven years old.  He was part of a musical family, and his mother, a music teacher and church musician, organized her seven children into a band.  Celius performed as accompanist for one of his mother's song recitals at age ten.

He graduated with a Bachelor of Arts degree, magna cum laude from the University of Minnesota, where he studied piano with Donald Ferguson and composition.  As an undergraduate, he performed his own piano concerto with the school orchestra.  In 1924 he won the "Schubert Prize" for piano performance, sponsored by the Schubert Club.  He used that scholarship to continue his studies at the Juilliard School, where he was a student of Josef Lhévinne in piano and Rubin Goldmark in composition.

In New York, where he lived for nearly fifty years, he performed his piano Sonata in E Flat at Aeolian Hall in 1925 and his Sonata for Violin and Piano in 1930.  As a result of the latter performance, he was given the privilege of working at the MacDowell Colony during the summers of 1931, 1932 and 1933 with artists who were "stimulating influences," including Thornton Wilder, Edward G. Robinson, Ruth Draper and Padraic Colum.  He composed the one-act opera Damia, based on Petronius' Satyricon during these years (1930–32).

He toured as an accompanist to several important singers, such as Maggie Teyte, Eva Gauthier, Povla Frijsh, Jennie Tourel, Marian Anderson, and Alexander Kipnis.  These performers often included Dougherty's songs on their programs.  He made recordings with Frijsh and Kipnis for Victor in the late 1930s.

Beginning in 1939, he also toured with Vincenz Ruzicka in duo-piano recitals.  During the next 16 years, they gave the first performances of duets by Igor Stravinsky, Arnold Schoenberg, Alban Berg, Paul Hindemith, Darius Milhaud, and others. They performed with the Vienna Symphony in 1955. A documentary on the duo was filmed in 1981.

Dougherty retired to Effort, Pennsylvania, and died there in December 1986.

Music
Dougherty composed one opera, about 200 songs, and a few instrumental works.  Since their creation, his songs have been considered excellent for student singers and are often heard on American recital programs.

The songs were composed over a 40-year period, from the 1920s to the 1960s.  They are simple, "generally optimistic, often humorous", and "rendered with taste and skill."  Because he was a pianist-composer, the piano accompaniments to his songs are usually well-crafted and interesting.

Musical Compositions

Songs for voice and piano

Ballad of William Sycamore
Children's Letter to the United Nations
Declaration of Independence
Eglantine and Ivy
Green Meadows (Anonymous text)
Heaven-Haven (text by Gerard Manley Hopkins), Carl Fischer, 1956
Hushed be the Camps Today (memories of President Lincoln) (text by Walt Whitman)
The K'e (text from the Chinese), 1954
Listen to the Wind (text by Wolfe)
Love in the Dictionary (text from Funk and Wagnalls dictionary), 1949
Loveliest of Trees (text by A. E. Housman), Boosey & Hawkes, 1948
Madonna of the Evening Flowers (text by Lowell)
A Minor Bird (text by Robert Frost, 1958
Music (text by Amy Lowell), 1953
Pianissimo, Lady (text by Lowell)
Primavera (text by Amy Lowell, 1948
Seven Songs
Song of the Jasmin (text from the Arabian Nights)
Songs by E. E. Cummings, 1966
thy fingers make early flowers of all things
until and i heard
o by the by
little fourpaws
Sound the Flute! (text by William Blake)
The Taxi (text by Lowell)
Whispers of Heavenly Death (song cycle for baritone and piano)
What the Bullet Sang (Bret Harte)

Song arrangements
Five Sea-Chanties
Five American Folk Songs, duets for soprano and baritone

Other works
Piano Concerto, 1922
First Piano Sonata, 1925
Violin Sonata, 1928
Second Piano Sonata, 1934
String Quartet, 1938
Music from Seas and Ships, sonata for two pianos, 1942-43
Many Moons, one-act opera, based on a story by James Thurber, 1962

Footnotes

See also
Bender, J. The Songs of Celius Dougherty, thesis, University of Minnesota, 1981.

References

.

External links
http://www.celiusdougherty.org official web site for Celius Dougherty

1902 births
1986 deaths
20th-century American composers
20th-century American pianists
20th-century American male musicians
20th-century classical musicians
20th-century classical pianists
American male composers
American classical pianists
American male pianists
Accompanists
Classical musicians from Minnesota
Songwriters from Minnesota
Juilliard School alumni
People from Glenwood, Minnesota
University of Minnesota College of Liberal Arts alumni
American male songwriters